This is a list of cemeteries in Pennsylvania.

Cemeteries in Pennsylvania

 Allegheny Cemetery, Pittsburgh (Lawrenceville neighborhood)
 Arlington Cemetery (Pennsylvania), Drexel Hill, Pennsylvania
 Beechwoods Cemetery, Washington Township, Jefferson County
 Bergstrasse Cemetery
 Calvary Catholic Cemetery (Pittsburgh), Pittsburgh - 
 Cedar Hill Cemetery, Philadelphia
 Cedar Lawn Cemetery, Lancaster
 Charles Baber Cemetery, Pottsville, Schuylkill County
 Charles Evans Cemetery, Reading, Berks County
 Chester Rural Cemetery, Chester, Delaware County
 Chestnut Ridge and Schellsburg Union Church and Cemetery, Bedford County
 Christ Church Burial Ground, Philadelphia
 Christ Hamilton United Lutheran Church and Cemetery, Stroudsburg
 East Harrisburg Cemetery, Harrisburg
 Easton Cemetery, Easton 
 Eden Cemetery, Collingdale
 Erie Cemetery, Erie

 Evergreen Cemetery (Adams County, Pennsylvania), Cumberland Township, Adams County
 Fair Hill Burial Ground, Philadelphia
 Fairview Cemetery, Pen Argyl
Fern Knoll Burial Park, Dallas, Luzerne County
 Gettysburg National Cemetery, Gettysburg
 Glen Dyberry Cemetery, Honesdale
 Glenwood Memorial Gardens, Broomall
 God's Acre Cemetery, Bethlehem (historic Moravian graveyard)
 Grandview Cemetery, Johnstown
 Greenwood Cemetery, Philadelphia
 Greenwood Cemetery,  Pittsburgh
 Har Nebo Cemetery, Philadelphia
 Harrisburg Cemetery, Harrisburg
 Highland Cemetery (City of Lock Haven, Pennsylvania), Lock Haven, Clinton County
 Holy Sepulchre Cemetery (Cheltenham Township, Pennsylvania), Glenside
 Homewood Cemetery, Squirrel Hill, Pittsburgh
 Indiantown Gap National Cemetery, Annville
 Ivy Hill Cemetery, Philadelphia
 Lafayette Cemetery, Philadelphia
 Laurel Hill Cemetery, Philadelphia, garden cemetery founded 1836
 Lawnview Memorial Park, Rockledge, Pennsylvania
Lebanon Cemetery, Philadelphia
 Lincoln Cemetery (Harrisburg, Pennsylvania)
 Lobb's Cemetery and Yohogania County Courthouse Site, West Elizabeth
 Magnolia Cemetery, Philadelphia
 Mikveh Israel Cemetery, Philadelphia, oldest Jewish cemetery in Philadelphia; founded 1738
 Mikveh Israel Cemetery (11th and Federal)
 Monongahela Cemetery, Monongahela
 Montgomery Cemetery, West Norriton Township
 Monument Cemetery, Philadelphia
 Mount Carmel Cemetery, Philadelphia
 Mount Lebanon Cemetery, Philadelphia
 Mount Moriah Cemetery, Philadelphia
 Mount Olivet Cemetery, Hanover
 Mount Peace Cemetery, Philadelphia
 Mount Vernon Cemetery, Philadelphia
 National Cemetery of the Alleghenies, Bridgeville
 Norris City Cemetery, East Norriton Township
 Northwood Cemetery, Philadelphia
 Odd Fellows Cemetery, Philadelphia; founded 1849 and removed circa 1951
 Oakland Cemetery, Indiana
 Oaklands Cemetery, West Chester

 Palmer Cemetery, Philadelphia
 Philadelphia National Cemetery, Philadelphia
 Pomfret Manor Cemetery, Sunbury
 Providence Quaker Cemetery and Chapel, Perryopolis
 Resurrection Cemetery, Wescosville
 Roosevelt Memorial Park, Trevose
 Shalom Memorial Park and Cemetery, Huntingdon Valley, Montgomery County
 Saints Peter and Paul Cemetery, Springfield
 St. John the Baptist Byzantine Catholic Cemetery, Pittsburgh
 St. Mary Cemetery, Pittsburgh
 St. Paul's Union Church and Cemetery, Ringtown
 , Whitemarsh
 Slate Hill Cemetery, Morrisville
 Swissdale Cemetery, Swissdale, Clinton County
 Swissdale Evangelical Cemetery, Swissdale, Clinton County
 Trinity Cemetery, Erie
 Unity Cemetery, Latrobe
 Upper Burial Ground, Philadelphia
 Vine St. Cemetery, Hazleton
 Washington Crossing National Cemetery, Newtown
 Weatherly Cemetery, Weatherly
 West Laurel Hill Cemetery, Philadelphia
 Wildwood Cemetery, Williamsport
 The Woodlands, Philadelphia, a National Historic Landmark

Gallery

See also
 List of cemeteries in the United States

References

Cemeteries in Pennsylvania
Pennsylvania